Four Treasures can refer to:
 Four Treasures of the Tuatha Dé Danann, four magical items in Irish legend
 Four Treasures of the Study, four implements for scholars in traditional China
 Four Treasuries, Qianlong Emperor collection of classics, histories, philosophy, and literary works